Lew Wallace High School was a four-year (9-12) public high school of the Gary Community School Corporation in Gary, Indiana, United States.

Staff 
The faculty included nearly 65 teachers.

History 
In 1926 the 45th Avenue School of Gary, Indiana was officially named Lew Wallace High School named after Lew Wallace. Wallace was a native to Indiana who served as a United States General during the American Civil War, as the Governor of the New Mexico Territory, the Ambassador to the Ottoman Empire, and as the author of Ben Hur. The "A and B wings" of Lew Wallace were constructed in 1933. The campus was renovated as recently as 1972, an addition that included the Richard Polk Gymnasium.

During a period of time, the school served K-12 students. The school offered community recreation programs on weekends.

As of 2014, the school was formally known as Lew Wallace Science Technology Engineering Mathematics (STEM) Academy.

Athletic programs included baseball, basketball, football, and track.

On Tuesday, June 3, 2014, the Gary School Board voted 4–2 to close Lew Wallace, along with 5 other schools. The building was reported to need $2.8 million of repairs. As of 2015, one year after closure, the building was reported to be in worsening condition. Between November 2021 and April 2022, the school was demolished.

Notable alumni 
Stacy Adams, former football coach at Valparaiso University
Vic Bubas, former basketball coach at Duke University
John Bushemi, war photographer
Joe Capua, All-American basketball player at Wyoming
Branden Dawson, class of 2011, Michigan State University alumni and NBA player
Tellis Frank, NBA basketball player
Milo Komenich, NBA basketball player
Jerome A. Prince, 21st mayor of Gary, Indiana
Jerry Shay, Purdue University Hall of Fame and All-American football player, NFL Defensive Tackle and current scout
Hank Stram, AFL/NFL Head Coach and Super Bowl Champion

References

External links 

Lew Wallace
Public high schools in Indiana
Schools in Gary, Indiana